Robert Kay Ball (August 26, 1925 – February 27, 1954) was an American racecar driver.

Early life
Ball's parents divorced when he was a year old. He was raised by his grandmother, who enrolled him in a military academy as a teenager in an attempt to take his mind off cars and motorcycles.

Racing career
Ball began racing with the Arizona Roadster Association, subsequently switching from roadsters to midgets. He won the Arizona State Midget Association (ASMA) championship in 1949 and 1950. He finished fifth in the 1951 Indianapolis 500 and 32nd in the 1952 Indianapolis 500.

Ball won the AAA Championship race at San Jose in November 1952. On January 4, 1953, he was involved in an accident at Carrell Speedway in Los Angeles which left him with terrible head injuries. He remained in a coma, first at the UCLA Medical Center and then at home in Phoenix, but died 14 months later of an infection.

Bobby Ball Memorial

For many years, one of the two championship races held at Phoenix International Raceway was a memorial race dedicated to Ball. The Bobby Ball Memorial was first run in the fall of 1954 and 1955 as a 100-mile race on dirt, sanctioned by AAA at the Arizona State Fairgrounds. Driver Jack McGrath was killed in an accident during the 1955 race. Starting in 1956, the race was sanctioned by USAC, and continued as a 100-mile contest at the fairgrounds through its 1963 edition. In 1964, the race moved to the newly opened Phoenix International Raceway and was run at a distance of 200 miles. It continued as a 200-mile race through the 1969 edition, then was run at a 150-mile distance starting with the 1970 edition, which was won by Swede Savage. The October 1971 edition was won by A. J. Foyt, after which, the race was renamed through sponsorship from Best Western for its 1972 edition. Bobby Ball naming returned for the 1976–1978 editions, the last of which was title sponsored by Miller High Life.

Complete AAA Championship Car results

Indianapolis 500 results

Complete Formula One World Championship results
(key)

References

External links
 

1925 births
1954 deaths
Indianapolis 500 drivers
Racing drivers from Phoenix, Arizona
Racing drivers who died while racing
Sports deaths in Arizona